Naygel Coffie (born 26 July 1996) is a Bonarian footballer who plays as a midfielder for SV Juventus.

Club career
Coffie played for Belgian amateur team Club Roeselare until 2013, when he joined Bonairan side SV Juventus.

International career
Coffie has made 4 appearances for Bonaire. His first appearance came against the US Virgin Islands in a 2014 Caribbean Cup qualification game and his most recent in the 2015 ABCS Tournament game against Curaçao.

Career statistics

International

References

External links
 
 Naygel Coffie at CaribbeanFootballDatabase

1996 births
Living people
Bonaire footballers
Association football forwards
Bonaire international footballers
SV Juventus players